Bonatitan is a genus of titanosaurian dinosaur from the Late Cretaceous Allen Formation of Argentina. It was named in 2004.

Description 
The type species is Bonatitan reigi, first described by Martinelli and Forasiepi in 2004. The specific epithet honours Osvaldo Reig. The holotype, MACN-PV RN 821, originally included a braincase and caudal vertebrae as well as limb elements. However, Salgado et al. (2014) emended the holotype to include the braincase only, and treated other elements catalogued under MACN-PV RN 821 as belonging to separate individual based on size and relative proportions. The genus and species names honor the famous Argentine paleontologists José Fernando Bonaparte and Osvaldo Reig.

References

External links 
 Fossilworks
 Dinodata
 Dino Checker
 Equatorial Minnesota

Saltasaurids
Late Cretaceous dinosaurs of South America
Campanian life
Maastrichtian life
Cretaceous Argentina
Fossils of Argentina
Allen Formation
Fossil taxa described in 2004